Dartmouth Dam is a large rock-fill embankment dam with an uncontrolled chute spillway across the Mitta Mitta, Gibbo, and Dart rivers, the Morass Creek and a number of small tributaries. The dam is located near Mount Bogong in the north-east of the Australian state of Victoria. The dam's purpose includes irrigation, the generation of hydro-electric power, water supply and conservation. The impounded reservoir is called Dartmouth Reservoir, sometimes called Lake Dartmouth. The Dartmouth Power Station, a hydro-electric power station that generates power to the national grid, is located near the dam wall.

Location and features
Designed by the State Rivers and Water Supply Commission of Victoria, construction commenced in 1973 and was completed in 1979 by Thiess Brothers, at a cost of A$179 million.

Once Dartmouth Reservoir reaches 99% capacity, it is considered to be 'operationally full' and releases are then set to pass inflows downstream to prevent the level rising further. Releases are passed through the outlet works and power station whenever possible and water will only flow over the spillway if significant flood inflows enter from upstream when the storage is close to full. This approach reduces the chance of downstream flooding, maximises operating flexibility for hydro-power generation and protects the spillway.

The Dartmouth Dam stores water from the Victorian "High Country's" snow fields for summer release into the Mitta Mitta (and the downstream Lake Hume) and subsequently into the greater Murray River for irrigation. The reservoir's inflow and outflow capacity is quite small considering its size, meaning that its levels vary little compared with some other dams on the Murray and their tributaries.

The reservoir is a popular recreational trout fishery, being regularly restocked by the Victorian Department of Primary Industries.

Hydro-electric power generation
It is owned and operated by AGL Hydro.

Power station damage
On 2 May 1990, the 180MW Francis turbine-generator running at full speed was instantaneously stopped by a foreign body left in the penstock following maintenance. The installation shifted about 2m within the base of the 180m high earth and rock fill gravity dam wall of the 3,906GL reservoir. After initial consternation regarding the integrity of the wall (declared safe after lengthy assessment), the hydro installation was repaired/replaced but was off-line for several years. A breach of the wall would have obliterated only a couple of small towns and a sparsely settled agricultural area in the relatively narrow 120 km Mitta Mitta valley below the dam, but more significantly, would have resulted in the over-topping and probable failure of the earthen walls of the 40m high 3,038GL Lake Hume, 200 km downstream on the Murray River. This is immediately upstream of the regional cities of Albury and Wodonga and a much more intensively settled irrigation area, and consequences would have been disastrous.

The turbine casing and concrete machine block surrounding the power station were destroyed in May 1990 when two steel beams entered the turbine. The resulting force ruined the power station and the dam's control systems, making it impossible to gradually release water from the near-capacity dam by conventional means. An improvised system, placing large pipes over the spillway to siphon water over it, was soon installed, but the inflow from an unusually wet spring was such that the dam would have overflowed anyway, leading to a spectacular cascade over the huge rock steps formed when the rock used for the dam itself was quarried from the valley walls. The station was subsequently re-built and recommissioned in 1993.

Pondage expansion
The capacity of the regulating pondage was increased in 2003 to further optimise the power station's generation flexibility.

Ecological impact on the Murray–Darling Basin
The construction and operation of Dartmouth Dam has caused significant changes to the flow patterns and ecology of the Mitta Mitta and Murray rivers. In particular, the unnaturally cold water released from the dam, up to 10 °C (18 °F) colder than it naturally should be, contributed directly to the disappearance of the Murray Cod, Trout cod and Macquarie Perch from the Mitta Mitta River within the first few years of the start of the dam's existence. Cold water pollution caused by Dartmouth Dam is also considered to have contributed to the disappearance of the freshwater catfish from the upper-reaches of the Murray River.

Climate

Although rainfall records span as far back as 1918, temperature records did not commence until 1975. Winter is twice as wet as summer, and occasionally it may snow.

See also

 Banimboola Hydroelectric Power Station
 Hume Dam
 Irrigation in Australia

Gallery

References

External links

Current water storage levels
Lake Dartmouth Fishing Information + Lake Maps. Sweetwater Fishing Australia

Dams in Victoria (Australia)
Lakes of Victoria (Australia)
North-East catchment
Rivers of Hume (region)
Dams completed in 1979
Dams in the Murray River basin
Embankment dams
Hydroelectric power stations in Victoria (Australia)
River regulation in Australia
Energy infrastructure completed in 1971
1971 establishments in Australia